Mitrofan Kodić (Serbian Cyrillic: Митрофан Кодић; born 4 August 1951) is a Serbian Orthodox bishop who has served as the head of the Serbian Orthodox Eparchy of Canada since 2016. He was formerly the Bishop of the Eastern American Eparchy.

In English, his name is sometimes spelled as Mitrophan.

Biography
Kodić completed his Seminary studies at Krka monastery in 1971. He was ordained as a hierodeacon by Bishop Stefan Boca in 1970, and as hieromonk on 6 January 1974. He studied in Bucharest from 1975 to 1977, then returned to Krka monastery. He was named assistant Rector of the Seminary in 1980 and Rector in 1987. In 1987 he was elected as a Vicar Bishop of Toplica District, and was appointed assistant to the Administrator of the Diocese of Midwestern America, Sava Vuković.

On 11 July 1987, in the Studenica monastery, Serbian Patriarch German with seven hierarchs and nine priests performed his bishop ordination. The next day during Divine Liturgy Patriarch German along with four bishops, sixteen priests and eleven deacons performed his consecration. He was appointed as Administrator of the Diocese of Midwestern America in 1988, and became Bishop of Eastern America in 1991.

In 1997 he earned his PhD, with his doctoral dissertation at the Theological Faculty of the Serbian Orthodox Church in Belgrade on the theme "The Mystery of Christ According to the Epistles to the Ephesians, Philippians and Colossians of the Holy Apostle Paul".

Along with Jesse Jackson, he played a key role in securing the release of three American GIs held captive during the NATO bombing of Yugoslavia in 1999.

He is also a Professor of the New Testament at the St. Sava School of Theology in Libertyville, Illinois.

Works
He translated from the Romanian Dumitru Stăniloae's Community and Spirituality in the Orthodox Liturgy, three volumes of Orthodox Dogmatics, The Immortal Image of God, Orthodox Moral Theology, and The Gospel Image of Christ by Dumitru Stăniloae, and The Romanian Patericon I and II and the Dictionary of Orthodox Theology by Hieromonk Ioanichie Bălan.

He has written two books: The Teaching of St. Apostle Paul on the Church, published in 1991 in Chicago (now translated into English) and Introduction to the Holy Scriptures, the New Testament.

References

1951 births
Living people
People from Šipovo
Serbs of Bosnia and Herzegovina
Bishops of the Serbian Orthodox Church
Serbian Orthodox Church in the United States
Eastern Orthodox bishops in the United States
Serbian Orthodox Church in Canada
Eastern Orthodox bishops in Canada
Romanian–English translators